The University of León is a Spanish public university with campus in León and Ponferrada.

The university is found in 1843, when it was created the Normal School for Teachers or Masters Seminar of Public Instruction and the subaltern school of Veterinary Medicine, founded in 1852, laying the foundations of Leon future university. Founded in 1979 as a splitting of the University of Oviedo, from the various schools and colleges that depend on that, more or less existed long ago in the city of Leon.

In recent years the university has signed important cooperation agreements, among which the one signed with the University of Washington, which has allowed the installation in Leon of the second European Headquarters this university to learn Spanish, with capacity for 500 students, and signed with the Xiangtan University, which has led to the establishment in the city of Confucius Institute.

Faculties and Schools 

The University of Leon has eight Faculties, six Schools and two private associated Schools. It also has the School of Languages and an IT Center, called Crai-tic, where the Calendula supercomputer is located. The Veterinary Hospital of Castile and León is also associated to the University.
 Faculty of Veterinary Medicine
 Faculty of Biological and Environmental Sciences
 Faculty of Laws
 Faculty of Arts
 Faculty of Economics and Business Administration
 Faculty of Work Studies
 School of Industrial Engineering and Information Technology
 Upper and Technical School of Mining Engineering
 Upper and Technical School of Agricultural Engineering
 Faculty of Education
 University School of Health Sciences
 University School of Social Work (Associated Centre)
 Faculty of Sciences of Physical Activity and Sport 
 University School of Tourism, León (Associated Centre)
 University School of Tourism, Ponferrada (Associated Centre)

References

External links

 

Universities in Castile and León
Educational institutions established in 1979
1979 establishments in Spain
León, Spain
Ponferrada